"Perreo Pesau'" is a song recorded by Puerto Rican singer Rauw Alejandro for his debut studio album, Afrodisíaco (2020). The song was written by Alejandro, Kenobi, Colla, Eric Duars, Mr. NaisGai, Roberto Rafael, Yensanjuan, and Álvaro Díaz, while the production was handled by Mr. Naisgai, Alejandro, and Caleb Calloway. It was released for digital download and streaming by Sony Music Latin and Duars Entertainment on March 5, 2021, as the third promotional single from the album. A Spanish language mid-tempo reggaeton song, it is a tribute to early-2000s reggaeton.

"Perreo Pesau'" received positive reviews from music critics, who complimented its energy and lyrics. The song charted in Peru and was certified quadruple platinum in Colombia. An accompanying music video, released simultaneously with the song, was directed by Alfred Marroquín and filmed in Carolina. It depicts Alejandro dancing through various areas of the city. The song was included on the set lists for Alejandro's the Rauw Alejandro World Tour and the Vice Versa Tour.

Background and composition

Rauw Alejandro announced that he was working on his debut studio album Afrodisíaco in February 2020. On November 2, 2020, he shared a video of himself dancing to a yet to be released song from the album and teased it: "Afrodisíaco has a lot of Perreo Pesau' [...]". One week later, Alejandro revealed the album's track list, including "Perreo Pesau'" as the 12th track. The album was released for digital download and streaming by Sony Music Latin and Duars Entertainment on November 13, 2020.

Musically, "Perreo Pesau'" is a Spanish language mid-tempo reggaeton song, and a tribute to early-2000s reggaeton. It was written by Alejandro, Kenobi, Colla, Eric Duars, Mr. NaisGai, Roberto Rafael, Yensanjuan, and Álvaro Díaz, with its production being handled by Mr. Naisgai, Alejandro, and Caleb Calloway. The track runs for a total of 4 minutes and 20 seconds. The lyrics include, "Las latinas en Miami / Esta noche no se prestan pa' nada / To' el mundo activa'o en los stories / Con esa tanguita tu no escondes nada / Pa' que te vean moviendo" (The Latinas in Miami  / Tonight they don't lend themselves to anything  / Everyone is active in the stories  / With that panties you don't hide anything  / So they can see you moving).

Promotion and reception

On March 3, 2021, Alejandro announced that an accompanying music video to "Perreo Pesau'" would be released in two days. On March 5, the song was released as the third promotional single from Afrodisíaco, with a music video directed by Alfred Marroquín and filmed in Carolina. The visual depicts Alejandro dancing through various areas of the city. As of April 2022, it has received over 100 million views on YouTube. The song was included on the set lists for Alejandro's the Rauw Alejandro World Tour and the Vice Versa Tour.

"Perreo Pesau'" was met with positive reviews from music critics. Los 40's Ignacio Videla praised the song's energy and thought it "definitely deserved his audiovisual piece". Also from Los 40, Laura Coca gave the track a positive review, saying it "invites us to give it our all without control with its reggaeton sounds and its catchy lyrics". The song peaked at number 216 on UNIMPRO's Peru Streaming chart and was certified quadruple platinum in Colombia. It was also certified gold in Central America by the Certificación Fonográfica Centroamericana (CFC) for receiving over 3,500,000 streams in the region.

Credits and personnel
Credits adapted from Tidal.

 Rauw Alejandro associated performer, composer, lyricist, producer
 Ramón Ayala composer, lyricist
 Jorge E. Pizarro "Kenobi" composer, lyricist, recording engineer
 José M. Collazo "Colla" composer, lyricist, mastering engineer, mixing engineer
 Eric Pérez Rovira "Eric Duars" composer, lyricist, executive producer
 Luis J. González "Mr. NaisGai" composer, lyricist, producer
 Roberto Rafael composer, lyricist
 Rivera Elias "Yensanjuan" composer, lyricist
 Jorge Alvaro Diaz "Alvarito" Díaz composer, lyricist
 Caleb Calloway producer
 Amber Rubi Urena A&R coordinator
 John Eddie Pérez A&R director

Charts

Certifications

References

2020 songs
2021 singles
Rauw Alejandro songs
Songs written by Rauw Alejandro
Sony Music Latin singles
Spanish-language songs